Partido Galeguista may refer to:

Partido Galeguista (1931), dissolved in 1950
Partido Galeguista (1978), dissolved in 1984
Partido Galeguista (Nationalist), 1984–1988
Partido Galeguista Demócrata, founded 2004, known as Partido Galeguista until 2011